Bansuri Guru is a 2013 Indian documentary film about the life of classical instrumentalist Hariprasad Chaurasia. Directed by Rajeev Chaurasia as his directorial debut, the film is introduced by Amitabh Bachchan.

Production
Bansuri Guru was produced by the Government of India's Films Division and features a series of interviews conducted with Chaurasia and others about the artist, including shots in Mumbai, Bhubaneswar and Rotterdam.

References

External links
 

Indian documentary films
2013 films
Documentary films about classical music and musicians
Hindustani music
2010s Hindi-language films